The Iranian schoolgirls mass poisoning reports are a series of alleged chemical attacks during which students in dozens of schools in Iran were reportedly poisoned in various and undetermined manners by unidentified perpetrators. These events started in November 2022, at the Isfahan University of Technology, and reports of thousands of students being poisoned in ongoing assaults were claimed to have occurred in the following months.  

In early March, Iran's government began to announce arrests had been made in connection with the incidents, although some Iranian health authorities announced that the vast majority of reported attacks were due to stress, anxiety, and other psychological factors. Mass psychogenic illness (MPI) has also been identified as a possible cause of the incidents. This is due to similarities of the Iranian situation to other claimed mass 'poisonings' of young girls later verified as being due to MPI, in Afghanistan, the occupied West Bank, and other locations in the world throughout history.

Proposed explanations 
Speculation about possible perpetrators includes: the Iranian government, seeking revenge for the protests against compulsory hijab which intensified following to the death of Mahsa Amini; Iranian hardliners who want to emulate Afghanistan's Taliban; or a militant Islamist group similar to Nigeria's Boko Haram, who tried to stop parents from sending their girls to school. Several officials have suggested that foreign "enemies" of the Islamic Republic may have launched attacks to denigrate it.

Robert Bartholomew suggested that the people affected may have been suffering from "mass psychogenic illness". He drew a parallel between the reported poisonings in Iran and those recorded in Afghanistan from 2009-2016, as well as the 1983 West Bank fainting epidemic. In all of these cases young Islamic girls fell ill from a mystery condition that was attributed to poison gas after someone drew attention to an unusual odor. With respect to the Afghanistan case, other studies have also concluded that the affected girls, who were attending schools in defiance of the Taliban, were suffering from mass psychogenic illness.

Simon Wessely of King's College indicated that key epidemiological factors point to this being a case of mass psychogenic illness. Some factors mentioned were: how cases spread across Iran; the fact predominantly only young people of a single gender reported problems; and the quick recovery of most people affected.

Chemical weapons expert and at the Royal United Services Institute, Dan Kaszeta, said that the incidents have similarities with a series of unproven poisonings in Afghan schools in the 2010s. A professor of environmental toxicology at the University of Leeds, Alastair Hay, reviewed blood tests results from Iranian girls suspected of being poisoned, and found no evidence of toxins. Kaszeta and Hay also told Nature.com that they have not ruled out that the Iranian situation is yet another episode of mass psychogenic illness. John Drury, a psychologist at the University of Sussex told Nature.com that previous poison scares "led to symptoms such as nausea, fainting, and hyperventilation" and that "it is hard to distinguish between psychogenic effects and exposure to actual hazards."

Speculation about type of poisoning
In February 2023, Alireza Monadi, the head of the Education, Research and Technology Commission of the Islamic Consultative Assembly, announced that nitrogen gas (N) was detected in the poison used at some of the schools. While nitrogen gas (which makes up the majority of the atmosphere) was originally claimed by the Iranian government as the cause of the poisonings, Morteza Khatami, Vice-Chairman of the Parliament's Health and Treatment Commission, later stated in March 2023 that "(N) gas does not explain the symptoms and clinical manifestations, but other gases have symptoms that justify the numbness of the body."

In early March 2023, chemical weapons expert Dan Kaszeta said it will be difficult to find reliable evidence of any type of poison used, due to toxic substances commonly degrading before any reasonable opportunity to collect a sample at the scene. Kaszeta also said that biomedical tests, such as blood and urine screening, "could indicate a type of poison used, but are complicated by a number of possible alternative culprits".

Iranian government reactions

Investigations into the poisoning reports have thus far been inconclusive. In response to these incidents, Ali Khamenei, the leader of the Islamic Republic of Iran, said that if it is proven that the students were poisoned, "those behind this crime should be sentenced to capital punishment and there will be no amnesty for them." Bahram Eynollahi, the Minister of Health, claimed that a "mild poison" was used against female students in Iranian schools.

Iranian president Ebrahim Raisi ordered that the series of incidents at some 30 schools since November be investigated. Officials have changed their stance from initially dismissing the incidents to acknowledging the scope of the crisis. On 3 March, Raisi publicly blamed "Iran's enemies" during a live state TV speech for the attacks, although no country was specifically mentioned, saying "This is a security project to cause chaos in the country whereby the enemy seeks to instill fear and insecurity among parents and students".  

According to IRNA, the parliament’s speaker, Mohammad Bagher Ghalibaf, said that both Qom and Borujerd were "dealing with student poisonings". The deputy health minister of Iran, Younes Panahi, said the aim of the poisonings was to shut down education for girls. He was quoted as saying "After the poisoning of several students in Qom schools, it was found that some people wanted all schools, especially girls’ schools, to be closed". Panahi also said that "in around 90 percent of the cases symptoms were caused by stress and anxiety when other students fell ill or caused by media reports of the poisonings."

On 6 March, an Iranian deputy health minister said that “irritant substances” were used in the attacks, but these affected less than 10% percent of students." He went on to say the suspected substance were not weapons grade or deadly. He also said that 90% of cases were caused either by anxiety when others became sick, or by learning of other poisonings from media." On 7 March it was reported that Yousef Nouri, the Iranian minister of education, said that "95% of the girls going to hospitals or medical centres had no medical problem – only fear and worry – while a few had underlying diseases." On that same day, the government of Iran reported for the first time that an undisclosed number of suspects had been arrested in relation to the alleged poisonings. 

On 10 March, Iran's legal authorities announced that agents responsible for the poisoning were identified and arrested in several cities. Iranian TV aired some confessions, however, the BBC noted that Iran TV has often aired forced confessions of people obtained by torture, and the confessed details were later determined to be false."

Reporting by non-Iranian state entities
On 2 March, the White House said that the Biden administration "does not know what is causing the apparent poisoning of schoolgirls in Iran." It also called for "a thorough and transparent investigation" to be conducted by the government there. The National Security Council spokesman said "...we don't know right now what caused those ailments. We see reports that the Iranian government are investigating it, that's the right course of action." However, he wouldn't commit to the U.S. government accepting Iranian investigation results as the truth.

The United States Institute of Peace, an American federal institution tasked with promoting conflict resolution and prevention worldwide, has monitored the reports from Iran and summarized them on its website.

On 1 March 2023, France 24 reported that as of that date just a single death had been reported in Iran due to the alleged poisonings across the country. That was an 11-year-old girl, Fatemeh Rezaei, whom activists claimed died after being poisoned at her school. Iranian authorities have denied this. Aljazira reported that Rezaei's death was linked to the poisonings by foreign media, but that her doctor said on Iranian state television that her death was due to an infection and not poisoning.

On 3 March 2023, as reported by Radio Free Europe, Annalena Baerbock, the German foreign minister, expressed outrage about the claimed poisonings and called for a full investigation, Tweeting "Girls must be able to go to school without fear."

On 8 March 2023, VOA News on Iran reported that Reporters Without Borders (RFS) had urged Iran to release a journalist who had been arrested and who had covered the poisoning reports. RFS claimed Ali Pourtabatabaei was arrested to silence him. The head of RSF’s Middle East desk also said about 30 journalists and other media employees had been arrested by the government, most during the crackdown on the protest movement.

On 10 March 2023, Al Arabiya reported on the state television airing the confessions of poisoning suspects, saying that "Iranian state media commonly air such reports", and that "the practice is condemned by rights groups who say the confessions are often forced and extracted through torture."

Timeline of reports
In the first three months of the attacks, no solid information was uncovered about the type of poison gas that may have been used. Complaints have included nausea, vomiting, cough, shortness of breath, heart palpitations and feeling lethargic. Some also reported that they smelled a tangerine-like smell.

November 2022
On an unspecified date in November: "Some students" from Isfahan University of Technology reported to a clinic with symptoms which included heartburn, diarrhea, and vomiting. According to the university’s president, initially 270 students showed symptoms, but eventually some 600 were affected. 

30 November: 18 students at the Noor Girls’ Conservatory in Yazdanshahr, Qom, reported symptoms of shortness of breath and numbness in the arms and legs.

December 2022
1 December: The country’s students’ trade union council said that a large number of students of Kharazmi University of Karaj suffered symptoms due to food poisoning from the night before. The chief justice of Alborz province stated that 160 students were affected. According to the ISNA news agency, in less than 10 days, more than 1,200 students (from various schools) "went to medical centers with symptoms such as nausea, vomiting, heartache and dizziness". 

13 December (22 Azar): Again at the Noor Girls’ Conservatory in Yazdanshahr, Qom, 51 female students reported symptoms and went to the hospital. Public Relations of Qom Education announced that experts were investigating the cause.

February 2023
February 27: Iran International published a photograph allegedly showing hospitalized schoolgirl victims. The same article also shared a video Tweet claiming to show the aftermath of a gas attack at Omar Khayyam High School in Pardis.

March 2023
7 March: The Guardian reported that the count of affected students stood at 7,068 in at least 103 schools from 99 cities, and that the record for daily attacks stood at 81.

12 March: Time.com reported on the arrests and also pointed out the confusion regarding the number of students who claimed illness, stating that an Iranian lawmaker investigating the attacks said that "some 5,000 students had become sick because of the poisonings," yet Iranian media reports a count closer to 1,000.

See also 

 Mahsa Amini protests

References

Attacks in Iran in 2022
Attacks in Iran in 2023
Attacks on schools in Asia
Mass poisoning
Qom
Violence against women in Iran